The Italian record progression men's marathon is recognised by the Italian Athletics Federation (FIDAL).

Record progression

See also
 List of Italian records in athletics
 Men's marathon world record progression

References

marathon M